Vetelnitsy is a rural locality (a village) in Kupriyanovskoye Rural Settlement, Gorokhovetsky District, Vladimir Oblast, Russia. The population was 48 as of 2010.

Geography 
Vetelnitsy is located 3 km south-west from Vyezd, 8 km south of Gorokhovets (the district's administrative centre) by road. Kupriyanovo is the nearest rural locality.

References 

Rural localities in Gorokhovetsky District